Vema may refer to:
 Prolaya Vema Reddy, the first king of the Reddy dynasty in Andhra Pradesh, India
 A Greek pace (unit of length)
 Research Vessel Vema, a research ship of the Lamont–Doherty Earth Observatory used by J. Lamar Worzel and Marie Tharp, and some ocean phenomena discovered using it:
 Vema (mollusc), a genus of monoplacophoran molluscs
 The Vema Seamount, a seamount in the South Atlantic Ocean at 31°38' S 8°20' E.
 The Vema hotspot, a hotspot (geology)
 The Vema Fracture Zone a fracture zone in the equatorial Atlantic Ocean

See also 

 To Vima, Greek daily newspaper